The Brute is a 1920 silent race film directed, written, produced and distributed by Oscar Micheaux. 
No print of the film is known to exist and the production is believed to be a lost film. The original version of the film included a scene where the boxer defeats a white rival, but Micheaux was forced to remove the scene by censors.

Plot
Herbert Lanyon is thought to be dead after a shipwreck, and his fiancée Mildred Carrison is forced by her money-minded Aunt Clara into marriage with "Bull" Magee, a gambler and underworld boss who mistreats Mildred. After Herbert returns, Magee undergoes financial difficulties that he blames on Mildred and Herbert, and seeks revenge. Herbert and a repentant Aunt Clara, however, free Mildred from Magee, and the lovers are able to marry. A subplot involves boxer "Tug" Wilson, who is ordered by his manager Magee to lay down in the seventeenth round of a prizefight at the film's climax. No other information concerning the plot has been discovered.
—American Film Institute

Cast
Evelyn Preer – Mildred Carrison    
A. B. DeComathiere – Bull Magee    
Sam Langford – Tug Wilson    
Susie Sutton – Aunt Clara    
Lawrence Chenault – Herbert Lanyon    
Laura Bowman – Mrs. Carrison    
Mattie Edwards – Guest in "The Hole"    
Alice Gorgas – Margaret Pendleton    
Virgil Williams – Referee    
Marty Cutler – Sidney Kirkwood    
Floy Clements – Irene Lanyon
Louis Schooler – Klondike    
Harry Plater       
E. G. Tatum       
Al Gaines

See also
List of lost films

Notes

References

External links

1920 films
Lost American films
Films directed by Oscar Micheaux
American black-and-white films
American silent feature films
Race films
1920 drama films
Silent American drama films
1920 lost films
Lost drama films
1920s American films